

2004

2005

2007

2008

2009

2010

2011

References

Awards for best film
Brazilian film awards